Pulled Apart by Horses is the self-titled debut album from the Leeds four piece of the same name. The album was announced to the public on 29 April 2010, along with the title of the first single "Back To The Fuck Yeah". The album was released on 21 June 2010 in the UK ahead of the tour that took place throughout June 2010, which included appearances at Glastonbury and the Reading and Leeds Festivals.

Track listing

iTunes Bonus track

Reception

Upon its release, Pulled Apart by Horses received positive reviews.

 Drowned In Sound  link 
 The Guardian  link
 NME  link
 Rock Sound  link
 Kerrang

References

External links
 Official website

2010 debut albums
Pulled Apart by Horses albums
Transgressive Records albums